Ingolf Lück (born 26 April 1958) is a German actor, comedian and television host.

Lück was born in Bielefeld. He hosted several sketch comedy shows; the best known, Die Wochenshow, aired on Sat.1 between 1996 and 2002.

He also hosted Pack die Zahnbürste ein, the German version of Don't Forget Your Toothbrush.

Selected filmography
  (1987), as Kai Westerburg

References

External links 
Ingolf Lück's official website in German language

1958 births
Living people
Mass media people from Bielefeld
German male television actors
German male voice actors
German television personalities
German television presenters
Sat.1 people
ARD (broadcaster) people
Actors from Bielefeld